IRONCAD is a software product for 3D and 2D CAD (computer-aided-design) design focused mainly on the mechanical design market that runs on Microsoft Windows. It is developed by Atlanta, GA based IronCAD LLC.

History
IRONCAD was originally developed by Visionary Design Systems (VDS) based in Santa Clara, CA. The product launched in 1998. In 2001 the development team led by Dr. Tao-Yan Han split from VDS (now known as Alventive) to form IronCAD LLC to continue the development of the IRONCAD product.

IronCAD descended from a product called Trispectives, developed by 3D Eye, an Atlanta-based company that was acquired by VDS.

Release History

Solid Modeling Methodology
IRONCAD primary focus is on 3D CAD design using solid modeling technology. IRONCAD uses both Parasolid and ACIS modeling kernels to provide computational methods for solving geometric calculations such as calculating blends and shells. Users create designs in 3D using a drag and drop design methodology by dragging and dropping shapes and components from 3D catalogs to build parts and assemblies. They then use those designs to communicate with other users in the design process using both 3D models and 2D drawings. The drawings remain associative to the 3D model so as the model is updated the drawings reflect the changes. IRONCAD also employs the use of direct face editing and allows the combination of features and direct face edits within the same part.

To assist people in learning products many users have written books on IronCAD's products to assist customers in training of the software.

References

External links

Computer-aided design software
Windows-only software
Computer-aided engineering software
Solid mechanics
Product design
Computer-aided design software for Windows